Motu Paahi is a  island in the Bora Bora Islands Group, within the Society Islands of French Polynesia. It is the located between Vananui, and Tane.

Administration
The island is part of Bora Bora Commune.
Its current population includes the staff operating the hotel.

Tourism
The island is the site of the Blue Heaven hotel 

In Paahi you will have no direct neighbors, giving you the luxury of holidaying on your own private and secluded island.

Transportation

After arriving in Fa'a'ā International Airport, an Air Tahiti inter-island flight (50 minutes) will bring you to Bora Bora Airport.

You will need to board the airline's catamaran shuttle to Vaitape, where the staff will take you to Paahi.

References

 
French Polynesia
French Polynesian culture
Geography of French Polynesia
History of French Polynesia